Vladimir Vladimirovich Matskevich (1 December 1909 – 7 November 1998) was the Deputy Chairman of the Soviet Council of Ministers from 9 April 1956 to 25 December 1956.

Early life
Matskevich was born in the village of Privolye-Marienthal, Chortitza volost (today village Prydniprovske in Zaporizhia Raion, Ukraine), in the family of an agronomist. He graduated from the Kharkov Zootechnical Institute in 1932.

Agriculture Minister
Matskevich was the Soviet Agriculture Minister from 14 October 1955 to 29 December 1960 under Nikolai Bulganin and again from 18 February 1965 to 2 February 1973 under Alexei Kosygin. Matskevich conferred with his American counterpart Secretary Earl Butz leading to a three-year, $750,000,000 deal for the Soviet Union to purchase grain from the United States. Henry Kissinger announced the deal from the "Western White House" at San Clemente on 8 July 1972. The Soviets needed to make up for agricultural shortfalls, agreeing to purchase the grain on credit at 6⅛% annual interest, the standard rate for the Commodity Credit Corporation of the U.S. Department of Agriculture.

Leadership
Matskevich served as the Ambassador of the Soviet Union to Czechoslovakia from 27 April 1973 to 6 February 1980. He was elected to the Soviet Central Committee in the 20th, 24th, and 25th Congresses of the Communist Party, serving from 1956 to 1961 and 1971 to 1981.

References

1909 births
1998 deaths
People from Zaporizhzhia Oblast
People from Yekaterinoslavsky Uyezd
Central Committee of the Communist Party of the Soviet Union members
People's commissars and ministers of the Soviet Union
Third convocation members of the Supreme Soviet of the Soviet Union
Fourth convocation members of the Supreme Soviet of the Soviet Union
Fifth convocation members of the Supreme Soviet of the Soviet Union
Sixth convocation members of the Supreme Soviet of the Soviet Union
Seventh convocation members of the Supreme Soviet of the Soviet Union
Eighth convocation members of the Supreme Soviet of the Soviet Union
Ambassadors of the Soviet Union to Czechoslovakia
Deputy prime ministers
Rural economy ministers of Ukraine
Second convocation members of the Verkhovna Rada of the Ukrainian Soviet Socialist Republic
Third convocation members of the Verkhovna Rada of the Ukrainian Soviet Socialist Republic
Recipients of the Order of Lenin
Burials in Troyekurovskoye Cemetery